You Go to My Head is an  LP album by Patti Page, issued by Mercury Records with 12 tracks as catalog number MG-20098 in 1956.

The album was reissued with an additional 4 tracks, and combined with the 1956 Patti Page album Manhattan Tower, in compact disc format, by Sepia Records on September 4, 2007.

Track listing

References

Mercury Records albums
1956 albums
Patti Page albums